SS Otaki was a New Zealand Shipping Company refrigerated cargo steamship that was built in Scotland in 1908 and sunk by a German merchant raider in 1917.

Otakis design is notable because she was the first ship whose propulsion combined reciprocating steam engines with a low-pressure steam turbine.

Otakis loss is also notable because although the merchant raider  sank her, Otaki damaged Möwe enough to force her attacker to return to port, ending her raiding career. Otakis Master, Archibald Bisset Smith, was posthumously awarded the Victoria Cross.

Four ships called Otaki
Ōtaki is a coastal town in the North Island, New Zealand, near the mouth of the Ōtaki River. The New Zealand Shipping Company has given the name to four successive ships. This article is about the second of those ships.

The first  was a  ship built in 1875. She was sold and renamed in 1892.

The third Otaki was launched in 1919. She was planned as War Jupiter, a  Type G2 war standard cargo ship for the UK Shipping Controller. The NZ Shipping Co bought her, had her completed as a refrigerated cargo ship and renamed her Otaki. She was sold and renamed in 1934.

The fourth  was a  refrigerated motor ship launched for the NZ Shipping Co in 1952. She was transferred to Federal Steam and renamed in 1967.

Turbines versus reciprocating engines
The fuel efficiency and performance of marine steam engines had been improved by compounding in the 1860s, followed by triple and quadruple expansion in the 1880s.

Each compounding stage has a larger cylinder and piston than the one before. A quadruple-expansion engine is more efficient than a triple-expansion engine and may be faster, but it is heavier and more complex.

A turbine is smaller, simpler, lighter, faster, smoother and more reliable than an equivalent triple- or quadruple-expansion piston engine. But a turbine requires higher fuel consumption and is efficient only at high speed.

William Denny and Brothers of Dumbarton built King Edward with three turbines and three propellers. A high-pressure turbine drove the shaft of her middle propeller. Exhaust steam from this turbine fed a pair of low-pressure turbines that drove her port and starboard (wing) propeller.

The first turbine-powered ocean liners,  and Virginian, were launched in 1904. Otaki was the first ship to fulfil his prediction.

Combining reciprocating and turbine engines
Denny's, who built King Edward, also built Otaki. Like King Edward with three propellers. But unlike King Edward a low-pressure turbine drove her middle propeller, her wing engines were triple-expansion piston engines, and exhaust steam from the wing engines drove the middle engine. Otaki was thus the first ship in which the fuel efficiency of a fourth stage of expansion was achieved not by a quadruple-expansion engine but by combining triple-expansion engines with a turbine.

Turbines do not work in reverse. Otaki was able to go astern efficiently by shutting down her low-pressure turbine, reversing her reciprocating engines and redirecting their exhaust steam straight to her condensers.

Laurentic was launched on 10 September 1908, less than a month after Otaki, and completed on 15 April 1909. Harland and Wolff had built Laurentics sister ship  with twin quadruple-expansion engines and without a low-pressure turbine, which allowed direct comparison of the two systems.

Laurentic proved to be more powerful and more economical than Megantic, thus vindicating the combination pioneered in Otaki. Denny's went on to build a passenger liner with a similar combination of machinery for the NZ Shipping Co. She was the  liner , launched in 1910.

Other shipbuilders adopted the same combination in ships that were large enough to justify having at least three propellers, and that needed a speed of at least . Ships with reciprocating engines and turbines driving separate shafts continued to be built until at least the 1920s. A later example is the second , launched in 1927 for White Star Line.

Parsons predicted that a combination of reciprocating and turbine power would eventually be applied to 10-knot ships in the tramp trade, but in practice this was not achieved until the 1920s.

Construction and description
Denny's built Otaki to carry meat from New Zealand to the United Kingdom. She was launched on 15 August 1908 and completed on 22 October. She had berths for six passengers.

Otaki had five single-ended Howden boilers supplying steam to the pair of three-cylinder triple-expansion engines that drove her wing shafts. When steaming ahead, exhaust steam from the low-pressure cylinders fed a low-pressure Parsons turbine that drove her centre shaft. Her turbine developed  at 227 rpm. These were far lower and more economical speeds than King Edward, whose middle propeller ran at up to 700 rpm and wing propellers ran at up to 1,000 rpm.

The drive from Otakis low pressure turbine to her middle propeller was direct. Reduction gearing to reconcile the high speeds of turbines with the low speeds of marine propellers was not introduced on ships until about 1911.

The NZ Shipping Co registered Otaki at Plymouth. Her UK official number was 124576 and her code letters were HNJG.

Career
In 1909 Otaki caught fire when she arrived in London. In November 1911 she ran aground in the River Thames and, before she was refloated, was rammed by the steamer Bitnia. Off Durban in 1915 Otaki stood by to assist the steamship Benalla, which had caught fire. Two months later in Auckland Otaki caught fire while bunkering.

By 1914 Otaki was equipped for wireless telegraphy, operating on the standard 300 and 600 metre wavelengths. Her call sign was MRP.

On 30 May 1916 Otaki became the first NZ Shipping Co vessel to pass through the Panama Canal, which had been opened in August 1914.

Loss

In the First World War Otaki was defensively armed with one 4.7-inch gun on her stern. Two Royal Navy gunners were added to her crew to train and lead a gun crew of volunteers drawn from a ship's civilian complement.

In late February or early March 1917 Otaki had sailed from Britain for New Zealand. Late on the afternoon of 10 March the Imperial German Navy raider Möwe intercepted her in the Atlantic about 420 miles west of Lisbon. Möwe had four 150-mm guns, one 105-mm gun and two torpedo tubes.

Möwe ordered Otaki to heave to.  Otakis Master, Archibald Smith, could have surrendered to ensure the safety of his crew. However, as a refrigerated ship built to carry food, Otaki was highly valuable to the Allied war effort. Smith had reason to want to prevent her scuttling or capture. He refused to surrender, and Otaki opened fire at a range of about 1,900 or 2,000 yards.

Otakis gunners were accurate, hitting Möwe's superstructure and hull, setting fire to coal in her bunkers, killing five German crew and wounding 10 others. But when Möwe opened fire with her four 150-mm guns she caused Otaki greater damage. The two ships fought for about 20 minutes, until Otaki had sustained about 30 hits. A shell from Möwe hit Otaki starboard aft, causing her to ship water, lose speed and lose manouevreability. Then Otakis 4.7-inch gun was damaged.

Smith ordered his crew to abandon ship but himself went down with his ship. Five of his crew were killed. The youngest was a 14-year-old midshipman, William Esson Martin, who had joined the ship in England only weeks before she was sunk. He had been a member of Otakis gun crew.

Möwe rescued and captured the survivors. It took Möwes crew two days to extinguish the fires Otaki had started and repair Möwes hull enough to stop her shipping water. Möwe then headed home to Germany for repairs. On her way home she sank two more merchant ships, but the damage inflicted by Otaki had forced the end of Möwes raiding career.

Legacy
In November 1917 King George V posthumously commended Captain Smith. In May 1919 Smith was posthumously awarded the Victoria Cross. Several other members of Otakis crew were given awards or mentioned in dispatches.

Both Captain Smith and Midshipman Martin had been pupils at Robert Gordon's College in Aberdeen. Martin's parents commemorated their son by giving the school a William E Martin prize to award annually for English and modern languages.

The school annually awards the Otaki Shield, presented by Smith's family, to a boy who is "pre-eminent in character, in leadership and in athletics" and P&O, which absorbed the NZ Shipping Co in 1973, pays for the winner to visit New Zealand.

References

Bibliography
 

1908 ships
Maritime incidents in 1917
Ships built on the River Clyde
Shipwrecks in the Atlantic Ocean
Ships of the New Zealand Shipping Company
Steamships of the United Kingdom
World War I merchant ships of the United Kingdom